Ariel Behar and Gonzalo Escobar were the defending champions but only Escobar chose to defend his title, partnering Diego Hidalgo. Escobar lost in the first round to Íñigo Cervantes and Oriol Roca Batalla.

Luis David Martínez and Felipe Meligeni Alves won the title after defeating Sergio Martos Gornés and Jaume Munar 6–0, 4–6, [10–3] in the final.

Seeds

Draw

References

External links
 Main draw

Challenger Ciudad de Guayaquil - Doubles
2020 Doubles